Uwe Sachs (born 5 April 1959) is a German wrestler. He competed in the men's Greco-Roman 90 kg at the 1984 Summer Olympics.

References

1959 births
Living people
German male sport wrestlers
Olympic wrestlers of West Germany
Wrestlers at the 1984 Summer Olympics
Sportspeople from Freiburg im Breisgau